Číhošť (in 1939–1945 Tschihoscht) is a municipality and village in Havlíčkův Brod District in the Vysočina Region of the Czech Republic. It has about 300 inhabitants.

Administrative parts
Villages of Hlohov, Hroznětín, Tunochody and Zdeslavice are administrative parts of Číhošť.

Geography
It lies in the Upper Sázava Hills.

In the municipality is located the officially calculated geographical centre of the Czech Republic. It is marked by a monument.

History
The village was the site of the so-called Číhošť miracle in 1949, which led to a crackdown by communist authorities against the Catholic Church and murder of local priest Josef Toufar.

References

Villages in Havlíčkův Brod District